Mirchi bada is a spicy Indian snack consisting of chili (mirchi) and potato or cauliflower stuffing battered and fried, served hot with tomato sauce or occasionally with mint and tamarind chutney. Banana pepper is used for making mirchi bada.

The mirchi bada of Jodhpur, Rajasthan is famous, as the water in that region lends it a unique taste. It combines well with another Jodhpur speciality, mawa kachori, dipped in sugary syrup.

References

External links
 Recipe at Mama's Kitchen
 Find Authentic Hyderabadi Mirchi Bhajji recipe 
 

Indian snack foods
Rajasthani cuisine
Stuffed vegetable dishes